Seonyudo may refer to:

 Seonyudo, Seoul
 Seonyudo, Gunsan